Annamaria Quaranta (born 19 October 1981) is an Italian female former volleyball player. She was part of the Italy women's national volleyball team.

She participated in the 2010 FIVB Volleyball Women's World Championship. She played with Pallavolo Sirio Perugia.

Clubs
  Pallavolo Sirio Perugia (2010)

References

Sources

External links
 

1981 births
Living people
Italian women's volleyball players
Universiade medalists in volleyball
Universiade gold medalists for Italy
Medalists at the 2009 Summer Universiade
21st-century Italian women